A Missouri Outlaw is a 1941 American Western film directed by George Sherman and written by Jack Lait Jr. and Doris Schroeder. The film stars Don "Red" Barry, Lynn Merrick, Noah Beery, Sr., Paul Fix, Al St. John and Frank LaRue. The film was released on November 25, 1941, by Republic Pictures.

Plot

Cast 
Don "Red" Barry as Cliff Dixon
Lynn Merrick as Virginia Randall
Noah Beery, Sr. as Sheriff Ben Dixon
Paul Fix as Mark Roberts
Al St. John as Dan Willoughby
Frank LaRue as Randall
Kenne Duncan as Henchman Pete Chandler 
John Merton as Henchman Bancroft
Carleton Young as Henchman Luke Allen
Frank Brownlee as Dairyman Jensen
Fred Toones as Snowflake

References

External links 
 

1941 films
1940s English-language films
American Western (genre) films
1941 Western (genre) films
Republic Pictures films
Films directed by George Sherman
American black-and-white films
1940s American films